Richard Blount (by 1512 – 1 January 1556), of Calais and London, was an English politician.

He was a Member (MP) of the Parliament of England for Calais in 1545.

References

1556 deaths
English MPs 1545–1547
Politicians from London
People from Calais
Members of the Parliament of England (pre-1707) for Calais
Year of birth uncertain